Godzillus is the informal name of a fossil discovered in the Late Ordovician (Katian) Kope Formation, which is situated near Covington, Kentucky. It was discovered in 2011 by amateur paleontologist Ron Fine, of the Cincinnati Dry Dredgers.  The reassembled fossil had a roughly elliptical shape with multiple lobes totaling almost  in length and is believed by Fine to have been nine feet-tall when upright. David L. Meyer, of the University of Cincinnati geology department, believed it to be a fossilized mat of algae. In 2016, Ron Fine, David L. Meyer, and two other scientists published a study implicating that the fossil might not be a new taxon and could instead have been a complex preservation of trilobites.

References

Ordovician fossil record
Specific fossil specimens